Albert Edward Deagan (14 August 1902 – 3 July 1968) was an Australian rules footballer who played for the St Kilda Football Club in the Victorian Football League (VFL).

Notes

External links 

1902 births
1968 deaths
Australian rules footballers from Victoria (Australia)
St Kilda Football Club players